Mochammad Solechudin (born May 11, 1991) is an Indonesian professional footballer who plays as a midfielder for Liga 3 club Sleman United.

Club career

Persekat Tegal
He was signed for Persekat Tegal to play in Liga 2 for the 2020 season. This season was suspended on 27 March 2020 due to the COVID-19 pandemic. The season was abandoned and was declared void on 20 January 2021.

References

External links
 Mochammad Solechudin at Soccerway
 Mochammad Solechudin at Liga Indonesia

1991 births
Association football midfielders
Living people
Indonesian footballers
Liga 1 (Indonesia) players
Pelita Bandung Raya players
People from Sidoarjo Regency
Sportspeople from East Java